Epermenia sergei is a moth of the  family Epermeniidae. It is found in the Russian Far East (Priamur’je and Primor’je).

References

Epermeniidae
Moths described in 1996